The Parrot Speaking Yiddish is a 1990 Soviet adventure film directed by Efraim Sevela.

Plot 
The film tells about the lack of sleep and his adventures during the Second World War. The film shows how he is captured, will pass through Sicily and will be in Indochina.

Cast 
 Ramaz Ioseliani as Yankel Lapidus
 Avangard Leontiev as Zaremba
 Marina Politseymako as Pani Lapidus
 Semyon Farada
 Algis Matulionis as Kurt
 Audris Chadaravicius
 Anna Afanasyeva
 Yuliya Menakerman
 Karina Moritts
 Vadim Zhuk

References

External links 
 

1990 films
1990s Russian-language films
Soviet adventure films
1990s adventure films